The Afghanistan cricket team toured Bangladesh in February and March 2022 to play three One Day International (ODI) and two Twenty20 International (T20I) matches. The ODI series formed part of the inaugural 2020–2023 ICC Cricket World Cup Super League. On 1 February 2022, the Bangladesh Cricket Board (BCB) confirmed the schedule for the tour. The ODI matches took place in Chittagong, with the T20I matches played in Dhaka.

On 13 February 2022, the Afghanistan team arrived in Sylhet to begin a week-long training camp ahead of the matches. However, shortly after the team arrived, eight Afghan cricketers and three members of their support staff tested positive for COVID-19. As a result, the entire touring party was placed into isolation for 48 hours. On 16 February 2022, all of Afghanistan's touring party returned negative COVID-19 tests. The team had requested a second round of testing after they believed the first round returned false positives.

In the first ODI, Afghanistan made 215 runs in their innings. In reply, Bangladesh were reduced to 45/6 in the twelfth over of their run chase, with Fazalhaq Farooqi taking four wickets. However, Afif Hossain and Mehidy Hasan then made an unbeaten 174-run partnership, with Bangladesh reaching 219/6 to win the match by four wickets. The 174-run stand between Afif Hossain and Mehidy Hasan was the highest seventh-wicket partnership for Bangladesh in an ODI match, and the second-highest seventh-wicket partnership in ODI cricket. In the second ODI, Litton Das and Mushfiqur Rahim set a new third-wicket partnership record for Bangladesh, with 202 runs. Bangladesh went on to win the match by 88 runs, winning the series with a match to play. Afghanistan won the third ODI by seven wickets, with Rahmanullah Gurbaz scoring an unbeaten century. Bangladesh won the ODI series 2–1.

Bangladesh won the first T20I match by 61 runs, after they had made 155/8 in their innings, and bowling Afghanistan out for 94 runs. Afghanistan won the second T20I match by eight wickets, with the series drawn 1–1.

Squads

Qais Ahmad and Mohammad Saleem were both named as travelling reserves in Afghanistan's team for the ODI matches. Prior to the first T20I match, Nurul Hasan was added to Bangladesh's squad, after Mushfiqur Rahim suffered an injury.

ODI series

1st ODI

2nd ODI

3rd ODI

T20I series

1st T20I

2nd T20I

References

External links
 Series home at ESPN Cricinfo

2022 in Bangladeshi cricket
2022 in Afghan cricket
International cricket competitions in 2021–22
Afghan cricket tours of Bangladesh